Stanhope–Sunderland ministry may refer to two ministries of the Kingdom of Great Britain:

 First Stanhope–Sunderland ministry, the British government under Lord Stanhope and Lord Sunderland (1717–1718)
 Second Stanhope–Sunderland ministry, the British government under Lord Stanhope and Lord Sunderland (1718–1721)